Events in the year 1996 in Kazakhstan.

Incumbents
President: Nursultan Nazarbayev
Prime Minister: Akezhan Kazhegeldin

Events

May
 May 23 – The L. N. Gumilyov Eurasian National University was established.

July
 July 19 – Kazakhstan takes part in the Summer Olympic Games in Atlanta as an independent country for the first time.

August
 August 16 – 13 athletes from Kazakhstan take part in the opening ceremony of the 1996 Summer Paralympics in Atlanta.

November
 November 8 – The Prince of Wales (now Charles III) visits Almaty during his royal tour of Central Asia.

December
 December 16 – The first military parade in honour of the Independence Day of Kazakhstan was held on the Republic Square in Almaty.
 December 17 – The Suleyman Demirel University was opened by Kazakh President Nursultan Nazarbayev, and former Turkish President Suleyman Demirel.

References

 
1990s in Kazakhstan
Years of the 20th century in Kazakhstan
Kazakhstan
Kazakhstan